Coming Full Circle is a 1995 role-playing game adventure for Call of Cthulhu published by Pagan Publishing.

Contents
Coming Full Circle is a set of four loosely connected non-Mythos scenarios taking place over a ten-year timespan.

Reception
Paul Pettengale reviewed Coming Full Circle for Arcane magazine, rating it a 6 out of 10 overall. Pettengale comments that "While the author's ability to weave an involving tale without recourse to Mythos is clever, the campaign ultimately suffers: regular players will be looking for a Mythos source to the mysteries in which they are embroiled, and frustration is a danger."

Reviews
Shadis #26 (April, 1996)

References

Call of Cthulhu (role-playing game) adventures
Role-playing game supplements introduced in 1995